Urmo Aava (born 2 February 1979) is a former Estonian rally driver who competed in the World Rally Championship between 2002 and 2009. His regular co-driver was Kuldar Sikk, who later became Ott Tänak's co-driver.

Career

Urmo Aava spent five years from 2003 in the Junior World Rally Championship driving for the successful Suzuki Junior World Rally Team. In this time his results improved, culminating in two runner-up positions in the final standings of the JWRC in 2006 and 2007. 2007 also saw sporadic outings in a privately run Mitsubishi Lancer WRC. In two of these events (Finland and New Zealand) he scored points.

For the 2008 season, Aava has negotiated a deal to compete 10 rounds in a Citroën C4 WRC car under the name 'World Rally Team Estonia' and with support from Citroën Sport Technologies. Aava showed promise in 2008 Jordan Rally, when he was running in 5th place before mechanical problems on the final day forced him to retire. Sardinia saw a steady run to 8th place and Aava's first points of the season. The next rally in Greece was even better. Two stage wins (helped by a favourable road position) demonstrated his pace and a 4th-place resulted – his best WRC result to date.
Followed by a 5th place at New Zealand's rally.

WRC results

JWRC results

References

External links

 Stats at Jonkka's World Rally Archive
 Stats at ewrc-results.com

1979 births
Living people
Sportspeople from Tallinn
Estonian rally drivers
World Rally Championship drivers
Citroën Racing drivers
M-Sport drivers